The "Baylor Massacre" (also "Skirmish Near Tappan", "Rebel Post Near Old Tapan", "Tappan Massacre", and "Raid on Old Tappan") was a British attack on September 27, 1778, which surprised the 3rd Regiment of Continental Light Dragoons under the command of Colonel George Baylor during the American Revolutionary War. It occurred in the present-day town of River Vale, New Jersey. The Continentals lost 69 soldiers killed, wounded, or captured. One British soldier was killed.

Setting

On September 22, 1778, Lt. Gen. Sir Henry Clinton ordered Maj. Gen. Sir Charles Grey, Maj. Gen. Lord Cornwallis, and Brigadier General Edward Mathew to mobilize troops in an effort to provoke Gen. George Washington into a battle, and as a diversion for a raid against a Patriot privateering base in southern New Jersey. After learning that Col. George Baylor had secured quarters for his troops, twelve officers and 104 enlisted men, in the barns of several farms on Over Kill Road—from Dutch "across the river", since renamed Rivervale Road—Cornwallis ordered Grey to pursue Baylor's troops.

Battle
Around 11 o'clock on the night of September 27, 1778, British Major-General Charles Grey mobilized the 2nd Battalion of Light Infantry, the 2nd Battalion of Grenadiers, as well as the 33rd and 64th regiments. Between one and three o'clock in the morning, six companies of light infantry under Major Turner Straubenzie and six companies of light infantry under Major John Maitland approached a collection of 3 farm houses and six barns occupied by 116 men of the 3rd Light Dragoons. Maitland's detachment was used to cut off the night patrol, while Straubenzee's troops used their bayonets to maintain the element of surprise as they went from house to house.

Deaths on the American side included two officers and nine men being killed in action, with another four later dying of their wounds. The total loss for the Continentals was 69 killed, wounded, or captured. Colonel Baylor, Major Alexander Clough, and two other officers attempted to escape by climbing up a chimney. Baylor was wounded and captured — he died in 1784 from complications of the wounds incurred in the attack. Clough was mortally wounded in the attack. One of the other officers was killed and several others captured.

After the attack, some of the injured prisoners were taken to the Reformed Church of Tappan in nearby Tappan, New York, which served as a prison and hospital.

The 52nd (Oxfordshire) Regiment of Foot, which was nearing the end of its service in the American War, was also involved in this incident. The events were described as follows by Captain Martin Hunter: "While at New Bridge we heard of their being within twenty-five miles of our camp, and a plan was laid to surprise them. We set out after dark, mounted behind dragoons, and so perfectly secure did the enemy think themselves that not even a sentry was posted. Not a shot was fired, and the whole regiment of dragoons, except a few who were bayoneted, were taken prisoner".

The raid for which this attack was a diversion also included an attack on American forces that has been described by Patriot sources as a massacre. On October 15, Loyalist troops executed a surprise attack on forces under the command of Casimir Pulaski in which 25 to 30 men were killed in what is known as the Little Egg Harbor massacre.

Discovery of remains
In 1967, the remains of six of the dead—recognized from artifacts such as buttons and clothing remnants—were found in three abandoned vats from Blauvelt's Tannery. In 1972, facing suburban development, the site was dedicated as a county park and the remains re-interred there.

See also
List of massacres in New Jersey

References

External links 
Bergen County Historical Society on the Baylor Massacre 
River Vale web site on Baylor Massacre History
Primary documents relaying the story of the massacre
Bergen County Parks Department site info and photos
RoherSprague.com-Baylor Massacre Burial Site panels

1778 in the United States
Battles of the American Revolutionary War in the New York City area after 1777
Massacres in 1778
Battles involving the United States
Battles involving Great Britain
Battles of the American Revolutionary War in New Jersey
Cemeteries in Bergen County, New Jersey
Conflicts in 1778
River Vale, New Jersey
Bergen County, New Jersey
1778 in New Jersey
Massacres in the American Revolutionary War
1778 murders in the United States